is a Japanese actress and voice-actress from Japan. Her major roles in anime include Mimino Kurumi/Milky Rose in Yes! Precure 5, Saotome Rei in Yu-Gi-Oh! GX, Sa Kōrin in The Story of Saiunkoku, Morita Yukari in Rocket Girls, Shimbara Yuuhi in Neo Ranga, and Arika in Medabots.

Career
She joined the Himawari Theatre Group in 1989. Later, she appeared in dramas and variety shows. Her debut as a voice actress came in 1997 in OVAs series Jungle de Ikou!.

For approximately 4 years from 2001, she worked with a theater company called Shanghai Jet and performed on stage. In 2002, Eri graduated from Tokai University Junior College (Takanawa campus). From 2004 until the end of May 2009, she was a member of the Tokyo Actor's Consumer's Cooperative Society. After freelancing, as of July of the same year, she joined Production Baobab. She became a freelance again on January 1, 2011, but later announced that she had joined Arkley (now Amuleto) on February 14, 2011. She returned to freelance on June 24, 2019.

She announced her marriage on her radio program, Eri Sendai's Natural Pancake, broadcast on October 29, 2014. On November 6, 2015, she reported on her blog that she had given birth to her first child, a boy.

Filmography

Anime
1998
Neo Ranga (Yuuhi Shimahara)

1999
Medabots (Arika)

2000
Medarot Damashii (Arika)

2002
Ghost in the Shell: Stand Alone Complex (Girl)

2003
Wolf's Rain (Leara)
Gunslinger Girl (Triela)

2004
Futari wa Pretty Cure (Shiho Kubota)
My-HiME (Kiyone Nonomiya)

2005
Rockman.EXE Stream (Maid B)
Futari wa Pretty Cure Max Heart (Shiho Kubota)
Best Student Council (Ayumu Oume)
Happy Seven (Kuan Kitayama)
Rockman.EXE Beast (Iris)
Gunparade Orchestra (Mao Suzuki)

2006
Yomigaeru Sora -RESCUE WINGS- (Atsuko Hongou)
xxxHOLiC (Ayaka)
The Story of Saiunkoku (Kourin)
Rockman.EXE Beast+ (Iris)
Sasami: Magical Girls Club (Chinako Tasai)
Chocotto Sister (Young Haruma)
Nighthead Genesis (Sakie Amamoto)
Sasami: Magical Girls Club Season 2 (Chinako Tasaki)

2007
Rocket Girls (Yukari Morita)
Yes! Precure 5 (Milk)
Sisters of Wellber (Sherry)
Bakugan Battle Brawlers (Runo Misaki)
The Story of Saiunkoku Second Series (Kourin)
Mushi-Uta (Shiika's Sister)
Dragonaut: The Resonance (Nanami Hoshi)
Yumedamaya Kidan (Ayako)

2008
Sisters of Wellber Zwei (Sherry)
Shigofumi (Fumika Mikawa)
Yes! Precure 5 GoGo! (Milk/Kurumi Mimino)
Top Secret: The Revelation (Michiru Sendo)

2009
Shugo Chara!! Doki— (Nemi)
Kurokami The Animation (Makana)
Chrome Shelled Regios (Mifi Lotten)
Kupū~!! Mamegoma! (Kyoko/Samantha-chan)
Miracle Train (Noriko)

2010
Bakugan Battle Brawlers: New Vestroia (Runo Misaki)
Cat Planet Cuties (Aiko Ishimine)
And Yet the Town Moves (Yukiko Arashiyama)

2011
Kamisama Dolls (Suō)
Last Exile: Fam, The Silver Wing (Marianne)
Future Diary (Tsubaki Kasugano)

2012
Love, Chunibyo & Other Delusions! (Toka Takanashi)
Code:Breaker (Aoba Takatsu)
Girls und Panzer (Caesar)

2013
Da Capo III (Mary Holmes)

2014
D-Frag! (Shinsen)
Love, Chunibyo & Other Delusions! -Heart Throb- (Toka Takanashi)
Lady Jewelpet (Lady Mizuki)
Majin Bone (Saho)
Daitoshokan no Hitsujikai (Kana Suzuki)

2017
Nora, Princess, and Stray Cat (Michi Kuroki)

OVA
 Carnival Phantasm: Hibichika Special - Chikagi Katsuragi
 Freedom - Chiyo
 Halo Legends - POM
 Jungle de Ikou! - Natsume/Mii
 Tekken: The Motion Picture - Young Jun

Films
 Jin Rō: The Wolf Brigade - Nanami Agawa
 King of Thorn - Shizuku Ishiki
 Pretty Cure All Stars series (2009-2014) - Kurumi Mimino/Milky Rose/Milk
 Yes! Precure 5 GoGo!: Okashi no Kuni no Happy Birthday! - Kurumi Mimino/Milky Rose/Milk
 Yes! Precure 5: Kagami no Kuni no Miracle Daibōken! - Milk
 Girls und Panzer der Film – Caesar, Yoshiko Akiyama
 Girls und Panzer das Finale: Part 1 – Caesar
 Love, Chunibyo & Other Delusions! Take on Me - Toka Takanashi
 Girls und Panzer das Finale: Part 2 – Caesar, Koume Akaboshi
 Girls und Panzer das Finale: Part 3 – Caesar, Koume Akaboshi

Video games
 Arcana Heart 2 - Angelia Avallone
 Arcana Heart 3 - Angelia Avallone
Arknights - Toddifons
 Detective Conan: Tsuioku no Mirajiyu - Moe Kasuga
 Kamiwaza - Suzuna
 Ougon Musou Kyoku - Furfur
 Suikoden V - Lyon

Dubbing
 The Rebound – Sadie (Kelly Gould)

References

External links
 Official blog 
 Official website 
 
 

1981 births
Living people
Japanese child actresses
Japanese video game actresses
Japanese voice actresses
Tokai University alumni
Voice actresses from Tokyo
20th-century Japanese actresses
21st-century Japanese actresses